Zürcher Schilling (or Grosse Burgunderchronik, Great Burgundy Chronicle) is the latest chronicle of Diebold Schilling the Elder of Bern (1484), treating the Burgundian Wars. It is kept in the central library in Zürich.

See also 
 Swiss illustrated chronicles

Swiss illustrated chronicles
1484 books